Enge Enadhu Kavithai is a 2002 Indian Tamil-language  romantic drama film directed by Aravind. The film stars Kunal, Krishna Abhishek, Sriman and Rathi, while Nizhalgal Ravi and Manivannan also appear in supporting roles. Featuring music composed by Bharadwaj, the film was released to a mixed response in May 2002. The film's title is based on a song from Kandukondain Kandukondain (2000).

Cast
Kunal as Babu
Krishna Abhishek as Krishna
Rathi as Kavitha
Ashwini 
Sriman as Bhaskar
Nizhalgal Ravi as Rangarajan
Manivannan
Dhamu as Senthil
M. S. Viswanathan as Krishna's and Rangarajan's father
Alex
Sindhu
Yugendran as Auto driver (Special appearance)

Production
The film marked the acting debut of Krishna Abhishek, a nephew of the Hindi film actor Govinda.

Soundtrack
Soundtrack was composed by Bharadwaj, with lyrics written by Snehan.

Release
Tulika of Rediff.com wrote that the film "ambles on in an amateurish way". Film critic Balaji Balasubramaniam wrote "as long as one doesn't realise that the movie is headed towards a familiar love triangle, it manages to be entertaining", though ultimately gave the film a negative review. Malini Mannath of Chennai Online wrote that "the earlier few scenes giving an impression that there is something to look forward to from the debutant director. But soon it turns into a predictable love triangle, with clichéd scenes, and a hasty unconvincing ending to boot".

Although Krishna Abhishek got offers to do more films in Tamil, he decided to act in Hindi films starting with Yeh Kaisi Mohabbat, which had the same producer as this film.

References

2002 films
2000s Tamil-language films
2002 romantic drama films
Films scored by Bharadwaj (composer)
Indian romantic drama films
2002 directorial debut films